Bourneville is a census-designated place in central Twin Township, Ross County, Ohio, United States. It has a post office with the ZIP code 45617. It lies along U.S. Route 50.

History
The first permanent settlement at Bourneville was made in the 1790s. Bourneville was platted in 1832 by Colonel Bourne, and named for him. A post office has been in operation at Bourneville since 1832.

As of 1847, an Indian stone work was located near Bourneville. It was surveyed by Ephraim George Squier and Edwin Hamilton Davis and was featured in their book, Ancient Monuments of the Mississippi Valley, which was published in 1848.

Gallery

Notable person
Philip Caldwell, businessman

References

Census-designated places in Ohio
Census-designated places in Ross County, Ohio
1832 establishments in Ohio